In jazz, the Tadd Dameron turnaround, named for Tadd Dameron, "is a very common turnaround in the jazz idiom", derived from a typical I−vi−ii−V turnaround through the application of tritone substitution of all but the first chord, thus yielding, in C major:

rather than the more conventional:

The Tadd Dameron turnaround may feature major seventh chords, and derive from the following series of substitutions, each altering the chord quality:

The last step, changing to the major seventh chord, is optional.

Dameron was the first composer to use the turnaround in his standard "Lady Bird", which contains a modulation down a major third (from C to A).  This key relation is also implied by the first and third chord of the turnaround, CM7 and AM7. It has been suggested that this motion down by major thirds would eventually lead to John Coltrane's Coltrane changes. The Dameron turnaround has alternately been called the "Coltrane turnaround".

Further examples of pieces including this turnaround are Miles Davis' "Half-Nelson" and John Carisi's "Israel".

References

Jazz techniques
Chord progressions
Jazz terminology